I'm Not Cool is the seventh extended play (EP) by South Korean singer-songwriter Hyuna. It was released on January 28, 2021, by P Nation and distributed by Kakao M. It is Hyuna's first Korean EP in nearly four years, following the release of Following (2017). The EP consists five tracks, including the title track of the same name and her previous digital single "Flower Shower".

Background
After Hyuna's comeback for August 2020 with Good Girl was postponed due to health issues, in January 2021, P Nation announced their first artist comeback of 2021 would be Hyuna's first EP for the label, and seventh EP overall, I'm Not Cool with the title track of same name. The EP includes Hyuna's first single after signing with P Nation, "Flower Shower".

Release
The EP was released on January 28 through many Korean online music services, including Melon. For the global market, the album was made available on iTunes. It was also released in physical format.
On her personal Instagram account, the singer revealed that the music video for the single "Good Girl" will be released on February 3, 2021.

Music video 
On January 26, a first teaser for the music video of "I'm Not Cool" was released. On the next day, the second teaser for the music video was released. On January 28, the official music video of "I'm Not Cool" was released.

Promotion
Hyuna held the first comeback stage for the EP during Mnet's M Countdown on January 28, where she performed the title track. On January 29, Hyuna performed the title track on KBS's Music Bank and You Hee-yeol's Sketchbook. On January 30, Hyuna performed the title track on MBC's Show! Music Core. On January 31, Hyuna performed the title track on SBS's Inkigayo. She also performed the song Good Girl in music shows.

Accolades

Track listing

Charts

Release history

References

2021 EPs
Korean-language EPs
Hyuna albums